Walga Rock, also known as Walgahna Rock and Walganna Rock, is a granite monolith situated about  west of Cue, Western Australia, within the Austin Downs pastoral lease. It is one of the largest granite monoliths in Australia.

It is of profound cultural significance to Aboriginal people; the Wajarri elders are the acknowledged traditional owners. An extensive gallery of Aboriginal art exists within a cave in Walga Rock.  While it is the subject of a great deal of research and fieldwork subsequent to a detailed examination conducted in the 1930s by the American anthropologist Davidson (who considered it to be "one of the most extensive galleries so far reported in Australia"), the first known European record of Walga is by Daisy Bates. Though she did not visit the rock and its gallery when travelling through the region in 1908, "Walga" is marked near the mining towns of Cue and Day Dawn and many other sites of Aboriginal significance on sketch Map 19 held at the State Library of Western Australia as part of her Special Map Collection.

Painting
Other than to the place and its ancient gallery, visitors are regularly drawn to an apparently anomalous painting of what appeared at first glance to be a European-tradition sailing ship. It  appears superimposed over some of  the earlier  works and underneath there are lines of writing that to some resembles a Cyrillic or Arabic  script.

Those believing the images represents a VOC ship, are of the opinion the  middle (or main) mast of the three shown in the Walga Rock/Walganha Rock image had broken and fallen overboard. Ratlines (to enable the crew to scale the rigging), and some stays (holding the masts vertical) are depicted and seven gunports are evident along the hull. 

Evidence now points to the image being that of a two-masted steamship with a tall funnel and Malaysian visitors  to the Shipwreck Museum in  Fremantle  advised they felt the four lines  underneath the Walghana ship could represent Jawi (a Malay-Arabic script).

SS Xantho: inspiration for the  Walga Rock ship image?
Of the two-masted colonial steamships operating in the north-west of  Australia,  owned by the controversial pearler and pastoralist Charles Edward Broadhurst is the most likely inspiration for the  Walga Rock painting. Research indicates the Walga Rock "gunports" may not be false at all, rather they are most likely  square or rectangular  scuttles (port holes) that can be opened like a gunport. These often appeared  on  passenger ferries designed to operate in  sheltered waters and were opened  for the comfort of its passengers when travelling in calm waters and when it got too hot below decks.

The first European account of the ship image appeared in the Christmas Edition of the Geraldton Guardian in 1928 and in looking since then to who the artist or artists may have been, research conducted by mid-west historian  Stan Gratte, based  on interviews conducted with "old Cue residents" and local station identities the Ryan brothers, indicates the Walga Rock painting was produced around 1917 at the time when Sammy "Malay", also known as Sammy Hassan, is recorded as having arrived there from Shark Bay. Apparently a "Malay" (the name generally but incorrectly describing indentured labourers who came to the north west from the islands north of Australia), Sammy Hassan remained camped for many years at Sammy Well outstation on the north east end of Dirk Hartog Island before leaving the Bay to join Wajarri people at a well near Walga Rock. It is possible that Sammy Hassan was one of many  hundreds of indentured "Malay" pearl divers who were transported to north west Australia in the early 1870s. Some "Malays" were abandoned by Broadhurst at Geraldton when  sank in 1872 and many others suffered a similar fate three years later in Shark Bay. Research into the possibility the lines of writing were Arabic further cementing a possibly link to Sammy Hassan has not established the link, however and despite a number of contemporary sources linking Sammy Hassan with the image, others disagree with the date, some believing it to predate his arrival in the area. Additionally, Shark Bay legend has Sammy "Malay" dying from a shark bite at his outcamp "Sammy Well". Further, though accepting the image is likely to represent  in her most recent research anthropologist Esmée Webb disputes the Sammy "Malay" connection believing it to be a Yamaji "warning story" about pearlers capturing Aboriginal men and women and marooning them on offshore islands. 

In 2020 the many claims and theories were examined in a paper entitled "The Walga Rock Ship: Chronicle of a Century-Old Unsolved Mystery".

References

Further reading
 Bigourdan, N., & McCarthy, M., 2007. Aboriginal watercraft depictions in Australia: on land and underwater? Bulletin of the Australasian Institute for Maritime Archaeology, 31: 1-10.
 Gunn, R. G. et al. (1997)_Walga Rock (Walganha) : a Wajarri rock art and Dreaming site in the Murchison Basin, Western Australia : WA Register of Aboriginal sites no. P249 / a report to the Yamaji Language Centre, Geraldton and the Australian Heritage Commission, Perth ; by R.G. Gunn, R.E. Webb and D.E. Marmion. Geraldton, W.A. : Yamaji Language Centre.
 Hussey, B.M.J. (2003) Ferals at Walga Rock.(regarding feral animals)  Western Australian naturalist, Vol.24, no.2 (30 Dec. 2003), p. 115-117
 Jenkinson, Charles.(2004) Site returned. Wilgie Mia and Walga Rock handed over to their traditional owners - the custodianship of the Wajarri Tribal Elders. Geraldton guardian, 19 Nov. 2004, p. 13
 Laud, Peter.(2001) Rock art under study. Destinations, Mar/Apr. 2001, p. 8-9, 
 McCarthy, M., 2000. "Iron and steamship archaeology:success and failure on the SS Xantho". Kluwer/Plenum. p. 60-1.

Playford, P., 1996, "Carpet of Silver: the wreck of the Zuytdorp". UWA Press, Nedlands.WA. 
 Webb, R. E. and Gunn, R.G.(1999) Walga Rock. Part 2 : preliminery artefact analysis, detailed art recording : Western Australian Register of Aboriginal Sites no. P249 / second report to the Yamaji Language Centre, Geraldton and the Australian Heritage Commission, Canberra. East Perth, W.A. : Distributed by the Heritage Council of W.A.
 Webb, R. E. (2003) Management work undertaken at Walganha (Walga Rock), an Aboriginal rock-art site, near Cue, Western Australia / a report to the Heritage Assistance & Projects Section, Department of Environment & Heritage, Canberra, ACT, Thoo Thoo Warninha Aboriginal Corporation, Cue, WA, and the Shire of Cue . East Perth, W.A.  Distributed by the Heritage Council of W.A..

Mid West (Western Australia)
Australian Aboriginal cultural history
Landforms of Western Australia
Monoliths of Australia